The Pablo Neruda Award is a literary award granted annually by the  since 1987. It recognizes an author under 40 who is actively writing.

History
The creation of the Pablo Neruda Award was announced in July 1987 as part of the commemoration of the 83rd anniversary of the poet's birth. When announcing it, the Pablo Neruda Foundation stipulated that it would be granted annually to a Chilean writer, less than 40 years old, initially endowed with $3,000. This was later increased to $6,000.

At first, the award was given to an author for works including poetry, creative prose, and theater. Later the award changed to its current format, as it would be granted only to poets and, according to the Foundation's website, "in practice, was never granted to authors of other genres."

Winners

References

External links
 

1987 establishments in Chile
Awards established in 1987
Awards with age limits
Chilean literary awards
Literary awards honouring young writers
Poetry awards
Pablo Neruda